The  struck south-central Japan at 14:00 local time on 28 October.  It was the largest earthquake in Japanese history until it was surpassed by the 2011 Tōhoku earthquake. It caused moderate to severe damage throughout southwestern Honshu, Shikoku and southeastern Kyūshū. The earthquake, and the resulting destructive tsunami, caused more than 5,000 casualties. This event ruptured all of the segments of the Nankai megathrust simultaneously, the only earthquake known to have done this, with an estimated magnitude of 8.6  or 8.7 . It possibly also triggered the last eruption of Mount Fuji 49 days later.

Hōei (宝永) was the era spanning the years from March 1704 through April 1711.

Tectonic setting
The southern coast of Honshu runs parallel to the Nankai Trough, which marks the subduction of the Philippine Sea Plate beneath the Eurasian Plate. Movement on this convergent plate boundary leads to many earthquakes, some of them of megathrust type. The Nankai megathrust has five distinct segments (A-E) that can rupture independently. The segments have ruptured either singly or together repeatedly over the last 1,300 years. Megathrust earthquakes on this structure tend to occur in pairs, with a relatively short time gap between them: In addition to two events in 1854, a similar pair occurred in 1944 and 1946. In both instances, the northeastern segment ruptured before the southwestern segment. In the 1707 event, the earthquakes were either simultaneous, or close enough in time to not be distinguished by historical sources.

Damage
The earthquake caused more than 5,000 casualties, destroyed 29,000 houses, and triggered at least one major landslide, the Ohya slide in Shizuoka. One of Japan's three largest, it buried a 1.8 km2 area under an estimated 120 million m3 of debris. The Nara Basin shows evidence of event-induced liquefaction.

Characteristics

Earthquake
The magnitude of the 1707 event exceeded that of both the 1854 Tōkai and Nankai earthquakes, based on several observations. The uplift at Cape Muroto, Kōchi is estimated at 2.3 m in 1707 compared to 1.5 m in 1854, the presence of an area of seismic intensity of 6–7 on the JMA scale in Kawachi Plain, the degree of damage and inundations heights for the corresponding tsunami and records of tsunami at distant locations, such as Nagasaki and Jeju-do, South Korea.

The length of the rupture has been estimated from the modelling of the observed tsunami and the location of tsunami deposits. Initial estimates of 605 km, based on four segments rupturing failed to explain tsunami deposits discovered at the western end of the trough. Including an additional area at the southwestern end, part of the so-called Hayuga-nada segment, gave a better match, with a total rupture length in the range 675–700 km.

Tsunami
Along the southwestern coast of Kōchi, run-up heights averaged 7.7 m with up to 10 m in places; 25.7 m high at Kure, Nakatosa, Kōchi, and 23 m at Tanezaki.

Eruption of Mount Fuji
Evidence suggests that changes in stress caused by large earthquakes may be sufficient to trigger volcanic eruptions, assuming that the magma system involved is close to a critical state. The 1707 earthquake may have triggered a shift in static stress that led to pressure changes in the magma chamber beneath Mount Fuji: the volcano erupted on 16 December 1707, 49 days after the quake.

See also
 
 List of earthquakes in Japan
 List of historical earthquakes
 List of megathrust earthquakes

References

1707 earthquakes
Hoei earthquake
1707 tsunamis
Megathrust earthquakes in Japan
Tsunamis in Japan
Mount Fuji
Earthquakes of the Edo period
1707 disasters in Asia
18th-century disasters in Japan